The 2013–14 Boston College Eagles women's basketball team will represent Boston College during the 2013–14 NCAA Division I women's basketball season. The Eagles, led by second year head coach Erik Johnson, play their home games at the Conte Forum and are a members of the Atlantic Coast Conference.

Roster

Schedule

|-
!colspan=9| Regular Season

|-
!colspan=9 | 2014 ACC women's basketball tournament

Source

See also
2013–14 Boston College Eagles men's basketball team

References

Boston College Eagles women's basketball seasons
Boston College
Boston College Eagles women's basketball
Boston College Eagles women's basketball
Boston College Eagles women's basketball
Boston College Eagles women's basketball